A Rumor of War may refer to:
 A Rumor of War (book)
 A Rumor of War (miniseries)